Joe Conway was an American politician who served as the Attorney General of Arizona.

Joe or Jo Conway may also refer to:

Joe Conway, screenwriter of Paradise, Texas (film)
Joe Conway, a character on Skyhawks (TV series)
Joe Conway, candidate for Yeovil (UK Parliament constituency)
Jo Conway, character in Babes on Broadway